The 1972 Pro Bowl was the NFL's 22nd annual all-star game which featured the outstanding performers from the 1971 season. The game was played on January 23, 1972, at Los Angeles Memorial Coliseum in Los Angeles, California. The final score was AFC 26, NFC 13.

The Kansas City Chiefs swept the Most Valuable Player (MVP) awards, with placekicker Jan Stenerud named the game's offensive MVP and Willie Lanier selected as the defensive MVP.

This was the last NFL game overall played with the hashmarks (also called the inbound lines) set at 40 feet apart (20 yards from the sidelines); the next season, they were brought in to 18½ feet, the width of the goalposts, where they still stand to this day.

Attendance at the game was 53,647. Don McCafferty of the Baltimore Colts coached the AFC while the NFC was led by the San Francisco 49ers' Dick Nolan. The referee was Ben Dreith.

AFC roster

Offense

Defense

Special teams

NFC roster

Offense

Defense

Special teams

References

External links

Pro Bowl
Pro Bowl
Pro Bowl
Pro Bowl
Pro Bowl
National Football League in Los Angeles
January 1972 sports events in the United States